Mariposa is the Spanish word for butterfly.
It may also refer to:

Geography

Canada
 Mariposa, Ontario, former municipality of the southwest corner of Victoria County
 Mariposa, Saskatchewan, a rural municipality
 Mariposa (fictional town), a fictional Canadian town created by Stephen Leacock, modelled on Orillia, Ontario

Peru
 Mariposa, Satipo Province, capital of the Pampa Hermosa District in Peru

United States
 Mariposa County, California, a county in the U.S. state of California, located in the western foothills of the Sierra Nevada mountain range
 Mariposa, California, seat of the county in California
 Mariposa Township, Saunders County, Nebraska
 Mariposa, a master-planned community in Rio Rancho, New Mexico
 Mariposa station (Los Angeles Metro)
 Mariposa station (San Francisco)
 Mariposa Grove, a sequoia grove located near Wawona, California, in the southernmost part of Yosemite National Park

Sea vessels
 SS Mariposa (1883), iron ship of the Oceanic Steamship Company which provided service between San Francisco and other Pacific ports
 SS Mariposa (1931), Matson Lines ocean liner; renamed SS Homeric in 1953
 , a USCG seagoing buoy tender

Entertainment
 Mariposa (novel), a 2009 novel by science fiction author Greg Bear
 La Mariposa, a 1998 novel by Francisco Jiménez (writer)

People and history
 Mariposa War, a war between Native Americans and miners in California that lasted from May 1850 until June 1851
 Las Mariposas, nickname for the Mirabal sisters, Dominican political dissidents who opposed the dictatorship of Rafael Trujillo
 Mariposa Battalion, a California State Militia unit formed in 1851 to fight the Miwok and Yokuts people in the Mariposa War

Music
 Mariposa Folk Festival, a folk music festival in Ontario, Canada

Albums
 Mariposa (album), a 2015 album by Lodovica Comello
 Mariposa, a 1998 album by Jennifer Peña
 Mariposa, a 1992 album by Rein Sanction

Songs
 "Mariposas" 2022 single released by the Spanish singer Aitana with Sangiovanni
 "Mariposa" (song), a 2019 song by Peach Tree Rascals
 "La Mariposa", classical guitar composition by Francisco Tárrega (1852–1909)
 "Mariposa", a 1981 song by Freeez on Southern Freeez
 "Mariposa", a 2000 song by La Oreja de Van Gogh from El viaje de Copperpot
 "Mariposa", a 2003 song by Sugarfree
 "Mariposa", a 2005 song by Wideawake on Not So Far Away
 "Mariposas", a 2010 song by Shakira on Sale el Sol
 "Mariposas", a 2011 song by Belanova on Sueño Electro II

Artists
Mariposa, a pseudonym of Madeline Johnston

Other
 Mariposa botnet, a botnet involved in cyberscamming and denial of service attacks
 Mariposa lily, a bulbous plant species of the genus Calochortus; native to western North America
 Mariposa School of Skating, a Canadian figure-skating training center
 Moth, a flying insect related to the butterfly
 Mariposa (wrestler), American professional wrestler
 Barbie Mariposa, a 2008 movie (alternate title: Barbie: Mariposa and her Butterfly Fairy Friends)
 Mariposa, a 2020 Indonesian film

See also
 Mariposan, the Yokuts people and language of California